A return address on a piece of mail identifies where to return it to if it cannot be sent to the address.

The term may also refer to:
 Bounce address, a similar feature on email
 The memory address a return statement hands control of a computer program to